The Corruptor is  a fictional character appearing in American comic books published by Marvel Comics.

Corruptor may also refer to:

 The Corruptor, a 1999 American film
 The Corruptor (soundtrack), soundtrack to the film, composed mostly of hip hop songs

See also

 Corrupt (disambiguation)
 Corruption (disambiguation)